Marjorie Crawford and Jack Crawford successfully defended their title by defeating Meryl O'Hara Wood and Jiro Sato 6–8, 8–6, 6–3 in the final, to win the mixed doubles tennis title at the 1932 Australian Championships.

This match was scheduled to be the sole Final for Friday, 12 February but – because of falling light – remain unfinished that day with the score at one set all. The deciding set was played the next day following on the Singles and before the Doubles finals.

Seeds

  Marjorie Crawford /  Jack Crawford (champions)
 n/a
  Meryl O'Hara Wood /  Jiro Sato (final)
  Coral Buttsworth /  Charles Donohoe (semifinals)

Draw

Finals

Earlier rounds

Section 1

Section 2

Notes

References

External links
  Source for seedings
  Source for the draw.

1932 in Australian tennis
Mixed Doubles